Barry Dock Lifeboat Station (based in Barry, Vale of Glamorgan, Wales) was opened by the Royal National Lifeboat Institution (RNLI) in 1901. In 1922 the station received its first motor lifeboat, and in 1973 it was provided with a second lifeboat, which was eventually withdrawn from service in 1979.

The station then received a series of three different  lifeboats. The station currently operates a  lifeboat called Inner Wheel II and a  lifeboat called Frances Mary Corscadden was allocated to the station in 2018.

Fleet

All Weather Boats

Inshore Lifeboats

Station honours
The following are among the RNLI medals and other awards presented to crew members from Barry Dock Lifeboat Station:

Station fatalities
On 13 January 1965 Coxswain Swarts died while working on the  lifeboat Rachel and Mary Evans when he fell to the concrete floor of the boathouse.

References

External links

Barry Dock lifeboat station homepage

Lifeboat stations in Wales
Transport infrastructure completed in 1901
Barry, Vale of Glamorgan